Esther Pillar Grossi (Santa Maria, April 24, 1936) is a Brazilian educator. She was federal deputy for the PT in Rio Grande do Sul from 1995 to 2002 and has worked primarily in education.  In 1955, she went to Porto Alegre, where she studied mathematics, field where later a master's degree at the Sorbonne in Paris.

See also
Central Única dos Trabalhadores
UNESCO

References

1936 births
Workers' Party (Brazil) politicians
Members of the Chamber of Deputies (Brazil) from Rio Grande do Sul
Living people
Brazilian women in politics